Falaknuma railway station is a train station in Hyderabad, Telangana, India. Localities like Udden Gadda, Chandrayan Gutta and Barkas are accessible from this station.

History
This is one of the oldest stations in the Hyderabad built by the Nizams.

Location
Falaknuma station is near to Falaknuma palace. For the people who stay in Jangammet, Chandrayangutta  and Engin Bowli is nearer station to go Secundrabad and Shamshabad.

Lines
Hyderabad Multi-Modal Transport System
Falaknuma –  (FS Line)

MMTS trains will start from Falaknuma and it goes till Secunderabad. This station serves lot of poor people who can not afford any kind of vehicles.

Many Students and employees use this service.

Hyderabad has very good public transportation like RTC Bus service Railway service which serves a common man needs.

Most of the people in Hyderabad depend on public transportation.

 Falaknuma–Bhongir MEMU train
 Falaknuma–Jangaon MEMU train

See also
South Central Railway zone
Secunderabad Junction railway station
Hyderabad Deccan railway station
Begumpet railway station
Lingampally railway station
Kacheguda railway station
Malkajgiri railway station

External links

MMTS Timings as per South Central Railway
MMTS Train Timings
Falaknuma to Lingampally MMTS Train Timings
Falaknuma to Hyderabad MMTS Train Timings
 

MMTS stations in Hyderabad
Hyderabad railway division